"Man of Me" is a song written by Rivers Rutherford and George Teren and recorded by American country music artist Gary Allan.  It was released in July 2001 as the first single from Allan's 2001 album Alright Guy.  The song reached number 18 on the U.S. Billboard Hot Country Singles & Tracks chart.

Chart performance

References

2001 singles
Gary Allan songs
Songs written by Rivers Rutherford
Song recordings produced by Tony Brown (record producer)
MCA Nashville Records singles
Song recordings produced by Mark Wright (record producer)
2001 songs
Songs written by George Teren

MCA Records singles